S.O.A.R. is the second studio album by American hard-rock band Devour the Day. It was released on April 1, 2016.

Track listing

References

2016 albums
Devour the Day albums